Christopher Wheeler Tierney (born January 9, 1986) is a former American soccer player. He spent his entire 11-year career in Major League Soccer with the New England Revolution, primarily as a defender. Tierney scored 13 goals, including one at MLS Cup 2014, and contributed 40 assists in 245 appearances.

Career

College
After playing high school soccer at the Noble and Greenough School in Dedham, Massachusetts, Tierney played college soccer at the University of Virginia, appearing in 79 games with the Cavaliers, starting 38, and scoring 11 goals and adding 16 assists in his four-year career. As a senior, he scored a career-high seven goals, and assisted on seven more, helping his team to advance to the NCAA College Cup in 2006 for the first time since 1997. Tierney also played club soccer in the Boston Bolts youth program, under New England assistant coach Paul Mariner.

Professional
Tierney was drafted in the first round (13th overall) in the 2008 MLS Supplemental Draft. He made his full professional debut for Revolution on July 1, 2008, registering two assists in a US Open Cup third-round game against Richmond Kickers. He also played in the final of the 2008 SuperLiga, in which Revolution beat Houston Dynamo on penalty kicks after a 2–2 tie; Tierney scored one of the shootout goals.

Tierney became a regular starter for the Revolution during the 2010 season, starting in a variety of positions across the Revs' midfield and back line, including left back, center-back, right back, left midfielder, center defensive midfielder, center midfielder, and center attacking midfielder. He scored his first professional goal on September 4, 2010 in a match against the Seattle Sounders. The goal tied the game at 1, and New England went on to win 3–1. He scored the goal to tie it 1–1 in the 2014 MLS Cup Final. Tierney is known for his accurate and fast crosses, whipped in from the left.

Tierney was named the Midnight Riders Man of the Year for the 2016 season. He missed most of the 2018 season due to an ACL injury.

On November 15, 2018, Tierney announced his decision to retire from playing professional soccer. He had appeared in 273 total matches for the Revolution, scoring 13 goals and earning 40 assists.

Honors
New England Revolution
North American SuperLiga: 2008
Midnight Riders Man of the Year: 2016

References

External links
 

1986 births
Living people
American soccer players
Association football midfielders
Association football utility players
Major League Soccer All-Stars
Major League Soccer players
New England Revolution draft picks
New England Revolution players
Noble and Greenough School alumni
People from Wellesley, Massachusetts
Soccer players from Massachusetts
Virginia Cavaliers men's soccer players